The 1989–90 Yugoslav First Basketball League season was the 46th season of the Yugoslav First Basketball League, the highest professional basketball league in SFR Yugoslavia.

The season saw new developments in the business aspect of basketball in Yugoslavia as a result of the Yugoslav First Basketball League's basketball talent becoming interesting to rich NBA teams. With the country's still-formally-enforced strict sporting exit rules—stipulating that no player is allowed to transfer abroad before turning 28 years of age—already being bent and occasionally loosened (superstar Dražen Petrović going to Real Madrid at the age of 24 one year earlier), summer 1989 saw two more high-profile star players leaving the league way before turning 28: twenty-one-year-old Vlade Divac joining the Los Angeles Lakers and twenty-three-year-old Žarko Paspalj heading to the San Antonio Spurs.

Attracted by superior financial compensation in the NBA, the summer 1989 offseason saw yet another young Yugoslav star player freshly drafted into the world's best basketball league, Dino Rađa, even resort to unilaterally travelling to the United States and signing with the Boston Celtics despite having a valid contract with KK Jugoplastika; he would eventually be forced to return to Yugoslavia following a legal process before U.S. courts. With NBA scouts closely following a number of other Yugoslav League young players—such as Jugoplastika's Toni Kukoč and Žan Tabak, KK Partizan's Predrag Danilović, Saša Đorđević, and Miroslav Pecarski, KK Crvena zvezda's Rastko Cvetković, KK Cibona's Franjo Arapović, KK Zadar's Stojko Vranković and Arijan Komazec, KK Olimpija's Radisav Ćurčić, etc. not to mention a slew of even younger juniors coming up such as Dejan Bodiroga and Željko Rebrača—it was becoming clear that the decades-long system of keeping players in the country until the age of 28 was about to become impossible to keep maintaining.

Furthermore, with Petrović moving to the Portland Trail Blazers—along with Divac and Paspalj joining the Lakers and Spurs, respectively—the entire Yugoslav basketball media ecosystem began to change as well. Yugoslav Radio Television (JRT), country's public broadcasting system, bought television rights to an NBA package consisting of 26 NBA games (18 regular season games and 8 playoff games) from the 1989-90 season—mostly involving Lakers, Blazers, and Spurs—for US$28,000. The US$28,000 price tag (US$67,000 in 2022) was reportedly split between JRT's two biggest television affiliates—TV Beograd and TV Zagreb—with each one paying US$14,000. Carried in Yugoslavia starting from 19 November 1989, on tape delay, the NBA broadcasts marked the first time that games from a foreign basketball league games were shown on Yugoslav television.

From October 1989, the country also got its first-ever basketball specific periodical publication. A magazine named Koš with Vladimir Stanković as its editor-in-chief—devoted entirely to coverage of Yugoslav basketball league, Yugoslav national teams (men's and women's), and Yugoslav players abroad—was launched by the Borba publishing house, thus further indicating the level of popularity the sport had grown to in the country. The first issue of Koš featured Lakers rookie Vlade Divac on the cover, standing in front of The Forum in Los Angeles while wearing his number 12 Lakers jersey.

Regular season

Classification

Results 

Source:

Playoff 

The winning roster of Jugoplastika:
  Zoran Sretenović
  Velimir Perasović
  Toni Kukoč
  Petar Naumoski
  Zoran Savić
  
  Velibor Radović
  Aramis Naglić
  Žan Tabak
  Duško Ivanović
  Dino Rađa
  Paško Tomić
  Teo Čizmić
  Luka Pavićević

Coach:  Božidar Maljković

Scoring leaders
 Arijan Komazec (Zadar) - ___ points (31.5ppg)

Qualification in 1990-91 season European competitions 

FIBA European Champions Cup
 Jugoplastika (champions)

FIBA Cup Winners' Cup
 Crvena Zvezda (Cup finalist)

FIBA Korać Cup
 Zadar (3rd)
 Cibona (4th)
 Vojvodina (playoffs)
 Smelt Olimpija (playoffs)

References

Yugoslav First Basketball League seasons
Yugo
Yugo